Chibabo is a village in western Eritrea. It is located in Mogolo Subregion in the Gash-Barka region.

Nearby towns and villages include Aredda (1.4 nm), the district capital Mogolo (2.3 nm), Attai (4.4 nm), Aula (7.6 nm) and Samero (7.6 nm).

Villages in Eritrea